Alyson Dixon (born 24 September in Sunderland) is an English long-distance runner.

Athletic career
Dixon won the 2011 Brighton Marathon. She competed for England at the 2014 Commonwealth Games, but did not finish due to an Achilles tendon injury. She competed for Great Britain at the 2016 Summer Olympics in Rio de Janeiro, finishing 28th in the women's marathon.

In September 2019 Dixon won the 50km world championship in Brasov, Romania setting a world record time of 3:07:20. Her record stood until 2021, when it was broken by Des Linden.

Personal life
Dixon is an ambassador for St Benedict's Hospice in Sunderland. 

She first joined an athletics club as a girl when a friend did and because she wanted to go to Flamingo Land Resort as the club was going there.

References

External links 
 Aly Dixon's "About Me" page
 
 
 
 
 
 
 

1978 births
Living people
English female marathon runners
Commonwealth Games competitors for England
Athletes (track and field) at the 2014 Commonwealth Games
Athletes (track and field) at the 2018 Commonwealth Games
British female long-distance runners
English female long-distance runners
Sportspeople from Coventry
Athletes (track and field) at the 2016 Summer Olympics
Olympic athletes of Great Britain